A Deadly Legend is a 2020 American horror film written by Eric Wolfe, directed by Pamela Moriarty and starring Corbin Bernsen, Lori Petty and Judd Hirsch.

Cast
Kristen Anne Ferraro as Joan Huntar
Corbin Bernsen as Matthias Leary
Lori Petty as Wanda Pearson
Judd Hirsch as Carl Turner

Release
The film was released on July 10, 2020.

Reception
The film has a 33% rating on Rotten Tomatoes based on six reviews.

Alexandra Heller-Nicholas of AWFJ.org gave the film a positive review and wrote, "Some films are great, some achieve greatness, and some have greatness thrust upon them; A Deadly Legend is definitely the latter, and that greatness explicitly comes in the shape of Lori Petty’s brief but divine cameo."

Rob Rector of Film Threat rated the film a 3 out of 10, calling it "a hodge-podge of horror elements that never add up to anything of substance and undercut by a budget that is well under its aspirations."

References

External links